Konstantinos Drampis (born in 1952) is a Greek footballer was a star midfielder for Aris Thessaloniki F.C. during the '70. He was fourth, on the all-time scorers list for Aris, having found the mark 48 times in his 250 appearances for the club. He was promoted as a first team regular by Wilf McGuinness in 1971 and left for Makedonikos after ten years where he retired in 1984.,

References

1952 births
Living people
Greek footballers
Aris Thessaloniki F.C. players
Makedonikos F.C. players
Aris Thessaloniki F.C. non-playing staff
Association football midfielders
Footballers from Florina